Sebastian Steve Qvacoe Cann-Svärd (born 15 January 1983), commonly known as Sebastian Svärd, is a Danish former professional footballer who played as a defensive midfielder.

Club career
Svärd was born in Hvidovre, Denmark, to a Swedish mother and Ghanaian father, and grew up in Urbanplanen, a neighbourhood consisting of subsidized housing in Vestamager. He started out at local Amager-based club B.1908, before moving to Kjøbenhavns Boldklub, the reserve team of F.C. Copenhagen. Here he was seen as a prodigy, impressing the coaches of the Denmark under-16, under-17 and under-19 national teams. As so he was bought by English club Arsenal for an undisclosed fee in November 2000.

He won the FA Youth Cup with the club's academy in his first season. His first-team Arsenal debut came in a League Cup fourth round match on 27 November 2001, as a substitute in a 2–0 win over Grimsby Town. Over the next two years, he made two more appearances for Arsenal, one more in the League Cup against Sunderland and one in the FA Cup against Oxford United. Arsenal went on to win the FA Cup final that season but Svärd was left out of the squad.

He returned on loan to his old club Copenhagen in August 2003, in need of first-team play; after just four months he returned to England to play for Stoke City, for whom he played nine league matches and scored one goal against Sunderland. In August 2004, he came on as a substitute in Arsenal's 3–1 Community Shield victory over Manchester United.

As such soon afterwards he was loaned to Danish club Brøndby IF for the whole season. At Brøndby, he played both as a defensive midfielder and right back, in a season which ended with both the Danish Superliga championship and triumph in the Danish Cup tournament. Altogether Svärd was capped a sum of four times for the Gunners.

In July 2005, he left Arsenal to join Portuguese club Vitória Guimarães for an undisclosed fee.

After a single season with Vitória, where he was, and still is a beloved player, he moved to Borussia Mönchengladbach on 21 June 2006, again for an undisclosed fee. On 25 February 2007, he played his first Bundesliga match for Mönchengladbach against Werder Bremen. He was snapped on loan upon 8 January 2009 by Hansa Rostock.

On 15 January 2010, he moved on from Borussia to become a free agent. Svärd was then signed only three days later by Dutch club Roda JC. Svärd then returned to Denmark and played three matches for Silkeborg IF in 2011–12. He was released by the club in June 2012, upon expiration of his contract.

In August 2012, he had two trials which did not result in a contract for him: with German club SC Paderborn 07 and with Hapoel Ramat Gan in Israel.

He joined Swedish side Syrianska for the 2013 Allsvenskan.

On 24 October 2013, he joined Wycombe Wanderers on a one-month contract.

In January 2014, Svärd signed with Thai club Songkhla United.

On 11 January 2016, he returned to Europe to sign with Icelandic top division club Þróttur. At the end of the season, Svärd left the club.

International career
Svärd debuted for the Denmark under-21 national team in November 2002. He played more than 50 matches for various Danish youth national teams.

Career statistics

Honours
Arsenal
FA Youth Cup: 2001
Community Shield: 2004

Brøndby
Danish Superliga: 2005
Danish Cup: 2005

Borussia Mönchengladbach 
2. Bundesliga: 2008

References

External links

Profile at Brøndby IF 
Profile at Voetbal International 

1983 births
Living people
People from Hvidovre Municipality
Danish people of Ghanaian descent
Danish people of Swedish descent
Association football midfielders
Danish men's footballers
Denmark under-21 international footballers
Denmark youth international footballers
Arsenal F.C. players
F.C. Copenhagen players
Stoke City F.C. players
Brøndby IF players
Vitória S.C. players
Borussia Mönchengladbach players
FC Hansa Rostock players
Roda JC Kerkrade players
Silkeborg IF players
Syrianska FC players
Wycombe Wanderers F.C. players
Sebastian Svard
Danish Superliga players
English Football League players
Primeira Liga players
Bundesliga players
2. Bundesliga players
Eredivisie players
Allsvenskan players
Sebastian Svard
Úrvalsdeild karla (football) players
Danish expatriate men's footballers
Danish expatriate sportspeople in England
Expatriate footballers in England
Danish expatriate sportspeople in Portugal
Expatriate footballers in Portugal
Danish expatriate sportspeople in Germany
Expatriate footballers in Germany
Danish expatriate sportspeople in the Netherlands
Expatriate footballers in the Netherlands
Danish expatriate sportspeople in Thailand
Expatriate footballers in Thailand
Danish expatriate sportspeople in Iceland
Expatriate footballers in Iceland
Sportspeople from the Capital Region of Denmark